Morobe Rural LLG is a local-level government (LLG) of Morobe Province, Papua New Guinea.

Wards
01. Kui (Kala language speakers)
02. Paiawa (Numbami language speakers)
03. Miama
04. Zinamba
05. Zigori
06. Amoa
07. Bosadi
08. Mou
09. Ana
10. Eware
11. Kobo
12. Eiya
13. Wuwu
14. Dona
15. Ainse
16. Zare
17. Siu
18. Popoe
19. Bau
20. Morobe Station
21. Pema

References

Local-level governments of Morobe Province